The girls' 200 metre freestyle event at the 2010 Youth Olympic Games took place on August 18 and the final on August 19, at the Singapore Sports School.

Medalists

Heats

Heat 1

Heat 2

Heat 3

Heat 4

Heat 5

Heat 6

Final

References
 Heat Results
 Final Result

Swimming at the 2010 Summer Youth Olympics